Bernadette Cattanéo ( Le Loarer; February 25, 1899 – September 22, 1963) was a French trade unionist and communist activist, as well as a newspaper editor and magazine co-founder. She is remembered as the secretary general of the World Committee Against War and Fascism. Cattanéo also held various roles of importance within the Confédération générale du travail unitaire (CGTU) and the French Communist Party (PCF).

Early life
Bernadette Le Loarer was born in Brélévenez, Côtes-d'Armor, February 25, 1899.  Her parents were Jean Marie Le Loarer, a railwayman, and Marie Ollivier, an illiterate peasant. Her family was Breton-speaking and Catholic but it was a teacher who awakened Cattaneo to socialist ideas. She trained as a seamstress before going to Paris in 1919 to do several odd jobs. There, she met Jean-Baptiste Cattanéo who, like her, was a pharmacy employee. They married on October 10, 1922 and had two children.

Career

At the end of 1923, Cattanéo joined the French Communist Party, with an interest in issues affecting women. She was fired from her job in a pharmacy for having organized a strike with her husband and found employment as editor of the newspaper La Nouvelle Vie Ouvrière in April 1925.

After a reorganization of the PCF, she directed its 35th department and was a member of the party's women's commission. At the same time, she joined the women's commission of the CGTU, of which she was appointed secretary in 1929, and joined the confederal office in November 1931. During this time, she was on the editorial board of L'Ouvrière. She traveled in France and Europe between 1925 and 1936 to follow the strikes organized by the CGTU.

Cattanéo was also active internationally since she took part in the fourth congress of Profintern on April 5, 1928 in the USSR where she met Joseph Stalin. She traveled there eleven times. Georgi Dimitrov made her responsible for setting up the World Committee of Women Against War and Fascism in 1934. In this coordinated development, she was secretary of the International Women's Organizations' Joint Coordination Committee, where she represented the PCF and the CGTU and associated with Gabrielle Duchêne and Maria Rabaté, herself a communist leader. The magazine  (Women in Global Action) was created in this connection and was managed by these three women.

When World War II broke out, she opposed the Molotov–Ribbentrop Pact, left the PCF and in late 1941 moved to Moissac in  France's Zone libre, where she coordinated a number of resistance initiatives. She returned to Paris in June 1944 and discontinued all her political activities.

Death and legacy
Bernadette Cattanéo died in La Penne-sur-Huveaune, Bouches-du-Rhône, September 22, 1963.

Her papers are held by the Grand Équipement Documentaire, on the Condorcet Campus.

References

1899 births
1963 deaths
People from Côtes-d'Armor
French trade unionists
French Communist Party members
French women trade unionists
French anti-fascists
French newspaper editors
French magazine founders
French pacifists